Björsäter is a locality situated in Åtvidaberg Municipality, Östergötland County, Sweden with 443 inhabitants in 2010.

References 

Populated places in Östergötland County
Populated places in Åtvidaberg Municipality